The Electoral district of Colac was an electoral district of the Victorian Legislative Assembly, one of the inaugural districts of the first Assembly in 1856.

Its area was defined by the 1855 Act as: 

Colac was abolished in 1859, its area became part of the new Electoral district of Polwarth and South Grenville.

The inaugural election took place on 3 October 1856; after votes for Rutherford and Theodore Hancock,
a Melbourne solicitor were tied at 46 each, Rutherford was elected by the casting vote of the returning officer.

Members for Colac

See also
 Parliaments of the Australian states and territories
 List of members of the Victorian Legislative Assembly

References

Former electoral districts of Victoria (Australia)
1856 establishments in Australia
1859 disestablishments in Australia